John J. Buro (born in Brooklyn, New York) is a professional American sportswriter and also a published author, screenwriter, and lyricist. He has published four novels: Open Court: A Year With the New York Knicks (2010), Deliver Us From Evil (2006), Bite of the Shark (2002), and Profiles: Stories from the Sidelines.  His first screenplay, Best Seats in the House, was written in 2004.

Buro is a graduate of John Jay High School (Brooklyn) and a past recipient of the George Goldstone Medal of Journalism.

References

External links
 Open Court (Book)

People from Brooklyn
Year of birth missing (living people)
Living people
Journalists from New York City
Sportswriters from New York (state)